Nick Powell, a British musician, sound designer and member of Strangelove (EMI) has written scores for films, artworks & theatre including RSC, The National Theatre of Scotland as well as on Broadway.

Theatre career
 
Recently Powell has been working with Sam Mendes scoring The Lehman Trilogy (National, Broadway and LA) & The Ferryman (West End & Broadway) as well as acting as music consultant on the Oscar-winning film 1917.
 
In 2022 Powell composed the music for two of the four galleries at Frameless, a permanent immersive gallery in the heart of London. These soundtracks are released on all major platforms.
 
Powell scored Spanish director Juan Cavestany’s feature Un Efecto Óptico, which premiered at the San Sebastian Film Festival in September 2020.
 
In 2018, Powell composed the music for the National Theatre's production of The Lehman Trilogy, which went on to transfer to Broadway and the West End in 2019. Powell was nominated for Best Sound Designer at the Olivier Awards and for Outstanding Music in a Play at the Drama Desk Awards.
 
In 2017, Powell scored the opening event the Edinburgh International Festival. In 2019 he co-scored Solar, a hugely ambitious live event in front of an audience of 100,000 people on the banks of the Danube in Linz, Austria. In 2017 & 2022 Powell scored the celebrations for the Guggenheim Museum in Bilbao’s 20th and 25th birthdays in audiovisual spectaculars projected onto the surface of the iconic building itself, attended by over 400,000 people.
 
He also composed the music for 59 Productions adaptation of City of Glass by Paul Auster, adapted for the stage by Duncan Macmillan and directed by Leo Warner at Home Manchester and the Lyric Hammersmith.
 
That same year Powell was the composer and sound designer on The Ferryman, written by Jez Butterworth and directed by Sam Mendes. It opened at the Royal Court Theatre, followed by a West End run at the Gielgud Theatre. The production transferred to Broadway the following year for which Powell was nominated for Best Sound Design of a Play at the Tony Awards and won a Drama Desk Award for Outstanding Sound Design.
 
In 2016 Powell was commissioned by The City Of Birmingham Symphony Orchestra & Birmingham Repertory Theatre to create Cold Calling: The Arctic Project in which a 20-piece orchestra joined actors performing against a backdrop of Arctic landscapes.
Awards include a New York Drama Desk & Spanish Premio Max as well as 2 Tony &  an Olivier nomination.
In 2021 Powell released his first solo album of songs, Walls Fall Down, a thrilling & visceral response to the upheaval and chaos of turbulent times. The album featured various long-time Powell collaborators including:
Alex Lee (Massive Attack, Goldfrapp), Sarah Willson (Belle and Sebastian), Chin Keeler, Lucy Wilkins (Snow Patrol), Una Palliser, Rob Spriggs, & Calina De La Mare (Heist).
Many of these collaborators returned on Music From The Black Box, a 17-track collection of instrumental music released in May 2022.
 
In 2015 Powell created the music for Lanark: A Life in Three Acts at the Edinburgh International Festival collaborating with, amongst others, Alex Lee, Nick McCarthy, Ted Milton, Sarah Willson, Chin Keeler and Lucy Wilkins.[8]
 
In 2010, Powell co-wrote Get Santa! alongside writer/director Anthony Neilson; the play premiered at the Royal Court Theatre. Powell continued his collaboration with Nielson on Alice in Wonderland at the Royal Lyceum Theatre, Edinburgh and Unreachable at the Royal Court Theatre.
 
In the same year Powell won the Spanish Premios Max Award for Best Composition in Scenic Arts for his work with Andrés Lima and Animalario on the show Urtain.
 
In 1993, Powell founded the theatre company Suspect Culture alongside director Graham Eatough and playwright David Greig; composing music for fourteen of their productions.
 
Powell composed the music for the National Theatre's critically acclaimed production of Othello, directed by Nicholas Hytner. He was also the composer and sound designer for the Royal Shakespeare Company's production of Dunsinane, directed by Roxana Silbert.
 
Powell was sound designer of the Royal Shakespeare Company adaptations of Hilary Mantel’s Wolf Hall and Bring Up the Bodies; adapted by Mike Poulten and directed by Jeremy Herrin. The productions were part of the 2013-14 RSC season followed by a West End run at the Aldwych Theatre. In 2015 The double-bill was re-titled Wolf Hall, Parts 1 and 2 for a Broadway run at the Winter Garden Theatre. Powell worked again with Jeremy Herrin on the UK premiere of The Nether by Jennifer Haley, a co-production between the Royal Court and Headlong. Following its run at the Royal Court in 2014, the production had a West End run at the Duke of York’s Theatre in 2015.

Film and TV work
Powell has written extensively for the screen including the BAFTA winning documentary Death in Gaza. He was also the co-composer for the BBC series Lip Service and he scored the Spanish feature films Dispongo de Barcos and Gente En Sitios for writer/director Juan Cavestany. In addition, he has scored three of the films of visual artist Phil Collins, including co-writing music for Socialism Today with Lætitia Sadier. Powell also worked as Music Consultant on Sam Mendes' film 1917.

Music career
Powell has toured and recorded with many bands including McAlmont & Butler, Strangelove and Astrid.  He is one half of OSKAR, who have performed live scores for three PRADA fashion shows in Milan, exhibited installations at the V&A and the CCA Glasgow as well as producing two albums Air Conditioning and LP:2.

Walls Fall Down was Powell's first solo album release. The album featured numerous guest players including Alex Lee, Sarah Willson, Chin Keeler, Lucy Wilkins, Una Palliser, Rob Spriggs, and Calina De La Mar and was released in March 2021. The album track, "Out of Key", featured in Juan Cavestany's film 2020 Spanish film, shot during the COVID lockdown, Madrid, Int. 2021 also saw the release of Powell's soundtrack to Spanish feature film Un Efecto Óptico and his solo piano soundtrack to The Lehman Trilogy.

Further work 
In 2016, Powell was commissioned by The City Of Birmingham Symphony Orchestra and Birmingham Repertory Theatre to create Cold Calling: The Arctic Project; in which a 20 piece orchestra joined actors performing against a backdrop of Arctic landscapes.

Powell scored ‘Creation’ a stop-motion gallery installation as part of an ongoing project with visual artist Jessica Albarn in 2016.

Powell composed the music for the 59 Production’s Bloom, a multimedia installation in Edinburgh’s St Andrew Square to mark the opening of the 70th Edinburgh International Festival.  In October 2017 Powell joined Alex Lee in composing music for 59's Reflections; an animation projected in the Guggenhaim Museum, Bilbao.

References

Living people
British male composers
British male musicians
British film score composers
British record producers
British sound designers
Year of birth missing (living people)